Strickland v. Sony was a court case that focused on whether violent video games played a role in Devin Moore's first-degree murder/shooting of three people in a police station. In August 2005, former attorney Jack Thompson filed the lawsuit against Sony.

History
Devin Moore was convicted in 2005 for the 2003 shooting of two police officers and a dispatcher as he was being detained for allegedly stealing a car. He grabbed one officer's .45 caliber pistol and killed all three before fleeing the station in a police cruiser he stole from the station. He was eventually caught and sentenced to death by lethal injection.

In March 2005, Thompson announced he was filing a lawsuit on behalf of the families of two of the three victims in Fayette, Alabama. He was also featured in a 60 Minutes special on the case.

On August 12, 2005, the third victim's family later joined the lawsuit. 

On November 1, 2005, Thompson sent an email to various websites commenting on the opening day of the civil trial. In it, he compared Sony and Take-Two Interactive's sale of the Grand Theft Auto video game to Imperial Japan's attack on Pearl Harbor during World War II. According to Thompson, certain regional governments in Japan had prevented the sale of the Grand Theft Auto games to minors, though Sony continued to sell the game where its sale was not restricted in Japan and abroad (Microsoft is doing the same for its own video game console). Thompson also compared the distribution of violent games to the distribution of pornography.

On November 4, 2005, Blank Rome submitted a motion to have Thompson removed from the case, stating that Thompson would "turn the courtroom into a circus."

On November 7, 2005, Thompson withdrew from the case, stating, "It was my idea [to leave the case]." He was quick to mention that the case would probably do well with or without his presence. This decision followed scrutiny from Judge James Moore; however, Thompson claimed he received no pressure to withdraw. At the same time, Judge Moore had taken the motion to revoke Thompson's license under advisement. Jack Thompson appeared in court to defend his right to practice law in Alabama (using Pro Hac Vice), following accusations that he violated legal ethics.

Just before leaving the case, Thompson filed a motion with the court, quoting noted designer Warren Spector (Deus Ex, Thief) as being critical of Rockstar's actions, taken from a speech Spector gave at the Montreal International Game Summit. He even implied that Spector could be served a subpoena to testify, even though the court's jurisdiction did not extend to Spector's place of residence.  On November 9, 2005, Spector lashed out at Thompson for taking his comments out of context, saying "Take two or three things, from different contexts, mash them together and you can mislead people pretty dramatically."

On March 29, 2006, the Alabama Supreme Court upheld Judge Moore's ruling against the dismissal of the case. Law firm Blank-Rome, representing the defendants, had previously attempted unsuccessfully to have the suit dismissed during the pre-trial since it argued that the defendants had a right under the 1st Amendment to sell mature games to minors. At the time of the sale, there was no law preventing such a sale. Thompson called the ruling "exciting" because "no one has ever before survived a motion to dismiss." At the same time, the Alabama Supreme Court agreed to hear arguments as to whether the Fayette County Court had the jurisdiction to preside over the case at all.

On July 29, 2009, the court granted summary judgement to Take-Two. One of the plaintiffs filed an appeal on Aug. 10, 2009 which the Alabama Supreme Court affirmed the lower court's ruling in Sept. 2010. The plaintiffs eventually chose not to seek further action and the case is officially closed.

Devin Moore 

Devin Moore was apprehended several hours after the shootings in Mississippi. According to the Associated Press, after his recapture he said, "Life is a video game. Everybody's got to die sometime." Once in custody, Moore quickly confessed. He told detectives that he shot the men because he didn't want to go to jail.

Moore faced trial in 2005 and pleaded not guilty. The trial judge barred the defense from introducing evidence to the jury that Grand Theft Auto incited Moore's shooting spree. Moore's attorney, Jim Standridge, contended that Moore was suffering from posttraumatic stress disorder at the time of the crimes. Standridge argued that Moore had been emotionally and physically abused by his father as a child.

In August 2005, Moore was convicted as charged. On October 9, 2005, he was sentenced to death by lethal injection. Jim Standridge appealed the case. On February 17, 2012, the Alabama Court of Criminal Appeals upheld Moore's conviction in a 5-0 decision. The case will automatically be appealed to the Alabama Supreme Court, and can then be appealed to the Supreme Court of the United States.

Alabama license revoked
On November 18, 2005, Judge Moore rejected Thompson's request to withdraw, and instead revoked his Pro Hac Vice admission (a temporary license to practice in a given jurisdiction), in an 18-page decision. Thompson responded with a letter to Alabama's Judicial Inquiry Commission, questioning Judge Moore's ethics and accusing him of violating the first 3 Alabama Canons of Judicial Ethics  Thompson also claimed the judge had "absolutely no authority" in preventing him from withdrawing from the case, and so therefore the court's decision to kick him off the case was a "legal nullity". He accused the court of punishing him for "aggressively telling the truth" while it "looked the other way when Blank Rome elegantly told those lies."

Judge Moore has also referred this matter to the Alabama State Bar for "appropriate action" remarking among other things: "Mr. Thompson's actions before this Court suggest that he is unable to conduct himself in a manner befitting practice in this state."

On November 21, 2005, Thompson claimed that "We had heard going into this civil case, before it was even filed, that a particular Western Alabama lawyer had to be part of our litigation team or Judge Moore would not give us a fair hearing. This lawyer himself claims, openly, that 'Judge Moore will not allow you to survive summary judgment if I am not on the case.' For too long we have heard swirling around this Judge allegations of improper influence." (sic)  Thompson alluded that the "fixer" was local lawyer Clatus Junkin, although Junkin denied he had any influence over any judges, or that he had made such a comment, as he was "not that dumb [...] or foolish enough to imply that [he] could [influence Judge Moore]." He also declined Thompson's request to join the plaintiffs' team, citing disagreements over Thompson's demands of complete control of any contact with the news media. Judge Moore noted that even though he had banned comments on the case outside the courtroom, Thompson had issued 7 different communications between the start of the case and the day he revoked Thompson's Pro Hac Vice. After being thrown off the case, Thompson requested that Judge Moore recuse himself from the case. Moore ignored him, stating "I can’t consider it because he’s no longer practicing in the state of Alabama. If some other lawyer in the case asks me to recuse myself, I’ll consider it in court."

On December 13, 2005, Thompson announced that he will be "assisting plaintiffs’ counsel during the discovery process and in the courtroom at trial" when the civil trial begins in 2006 (the judge ruled on both Thompson's dismissal from the case, and dismissal of the case itself, during pretrial hearings). He also claimed he "will likely be a witness in the case." Although he gave no details as to what he would be a witness to, except that he claimed he had "warned, in writing," Take-Two and Rockstar Games "that murders such as those in Alabama would occur by teens who had rehearsed the murders on their virtual reality killing simulators." Judge Moore forbade Thompson from "[communicating] with the court or the judge" or he "would be held in contempt of court." While that order was appealed, it has not yet been ruled on.

On February 16, 2006, Thompson sent a letter to the Alabama Bar, accusing Judge Moore of breaking the bar rules by publicly disclosing that he had filed a complaint about Thompson with the Alabama Bar. He accused Judge Moore of denying Devin Moore a fair trial, and claimed the FBI was investigating the Florida Bar's "disciplinary process". Thompson gave the Alabama Bar until "five o’clock p.m., Eastern time, February 17, 2006" to drop the complaint, or else he would file a "federal lawsuit in the United States District Court in the Southern District of Florida on Monday, February 20, 2006."

The Alabama State Bar rules state that a court official who revokes Pro Hac Vice due to conduct must refer the matter to the Bar for review, and the Bar decides if an investigation is needed. No complaint is required to open an investigation.

Thompson's deadline of February 17 passed, without action from either party.

On February 22, 2006, Thompson followed up with another letter, announcing that he had filed a lawsuit against the Alabama Bar, for investigating a complaint " which in fact was not even filed" in "violation of its own Bar Rules."

The Alabama Bar has not yet been served notice with any complaint from Thompson, nor has any Florida court acknowledged a civil suit being filed.

Thompson announced that the Strickland v. Sony plaintiffs were still his clients, and vowed to represent them in-court when the trial resumed.

On October 9, 2007, Thompson filed a lawsuit against the Alabama Bar with the U.S. District Court for the Southern District of Florida. The case was assigned to the same judge who had previously presided over attempts by Thompson to sue the Florida Bar, which were voluntarily withdrawn. Thompson claimed that his rights of "speech, petition, and religion" were violated when his Pro Hac Vice status was revoked.

References

External links

Boston Globe - "Ala. appeal in game-blame killings nixed"

2005 in United States case law
Grand Theft Auto
United States lawsuits
2006 in United States case law
Video game censorship
Video game controversies
Video game law
Sony litigation
Murder in Alabama